Lalita  is a 1949 Indian folklore Oriya film directed by Kalyan Gupta.

Plot
King Indradyumna completes a Temple at Puri, but cannot find the living deity, Nila Madhaba (Lord Jagannath). he sends messengers in all directions to bring him the news about Lord Nila Madhaba. One Brahmin messenger Bidyapati comes across a Savara village in the dense forest and stays there as guest to the Savara King Biswabasu. Bidayapati gets the hearsay about Biswabasu, who, secretly keeps the lord Nila Madhaba in a remote cave and worships him. Bidyapati pretends to fall in love with Biswabasu's daughter Lalita and finally marries her. Lalita persuades her father to show her husband, the Lord. Biswabasu agrees and takes Bidyapati to the remote secret cave. Bidyapati plans to take the deity to Puri, but the deity vanishes at last.

Cast
 Lokanatha Mishra... Bidyapati
 Uma Banerjee... Lalita
 Sumati Devi... Maya
 Pankaj Nanda... Bishwabasu
 Dampdar Das... Indradyumna

Snippets
It is the second Odia film released after a span of thirteen years from the first Odia film Sita Bibaha. Makhanlal Banerjee was the hero of the first Odia film, while his wife Uma Banerjee played the role of the heroine in the second movie, Lalita.

References

External links
 

1949 films
1940s Odia-language films
Indian black-and-white films